Varsha may refer to:

 Varsha (season), the monsoon season in the Hindu calendar
 Varsha (genus), an insect genus in the tribe Empoascini
 Varsha (2005 film), a 2005 Kannada-language Indian feature film directed by S. Narayan

People
Bob Varsha (born 1951), American sports announcer
Varsha Bhosle (1956–2012), Indian journalist
Varsha Gautham (born 1998), Indian sailor
Varsha Soni (born 1957), Indian field hockey player
Varsha Usgaonkar (born 1968), Indian actress
 Varsha (Telugu actress), Indian actress

See also
 

Indian feminine given names